A surface of revolution is a surface in Euclidean space created by rotating a curve (the generatrix) around an axis of rotation.

Examples of surfaces of revolution generated by a straight line are cylindrical and conical surfaces depending on whether or not the line is parallel to the axis. A circle that is rotated around any diameter generates a sphere of which it is then a great circle, and if the circle is rotated around an axis that does not intersect the interior of a circle, then it generates a torus which does not intersect itself (a ring torus).

Properties
The sections of the surface of revolution made by planes through the axis are called meridional sections. Any meridional section can be considered to be the generatrix in the plane determined by it and the axis.

The sections of the surface of revolution made by planes that are perpendicular to the axis are circles.

Some special cases of hyperboloids (of either one or two sheets) and elliptic paraboloids are surfaces of revolution. These may be identified as those quadratic surfaces all of whose cross sections perpendicular to the axis are circular.

Area formula

This formula is the calculus equivalent of  Pappus's centroid theorem. The quantity

comes from the Pythagorean theorem and represents a small segment of the arc of the curve, as in the arc length formula. The quantity  is the path of (the centroid of) this small segment, as required by Pappus' theorem.

Likewise, when the axis of rotation is the -axis and provided that  is never negative, the area is given by

for revolution around the -axis, and

for revolution around the y-axis (provided ). These come from the above formula.

Its area is therefore

For the case of the spherical curve with radius ,  rotated about the -axis

A minimal surface of revolution is the surface of revolution of the curve between two given points which minimizes surface area. A basic problem in the calculus of variations is finding the curve between two points that produces this minimal surface of revolution.

There are only two minimal surfaces of revolution (surfaces of revolution which are also minimal surfaces): the plane and the catenoid.

Coordinate expressions

Geodesics
Meridians are always geodesics on a surface of revolution. Other geodesics are governed by Clairaut's relation.

Toroids

A surface of revolution with a hole in, where the axis of revolution does not intersect the surface, is called a toroid. For example, when a rectangle is rotated around an axis parallel to one of its edges, then a hollow square-section ring is produced. If the revolved figure is a circle, then the object is called a torus.

Applications
The use of surfaces of revolution is essential in many fields in physics and engineering. When certain objects are designed digitally, revolutions like these can be used to determine surface area without the use of measuring the length and radius of the object being designed.

See also
 Channel surface, a generalisation of a surface of revolution
 Gabriel's Horn
 Generalized helicoid
 Lemon (geometry), surface of revolution of a circular arc
 Liouville surface, another generalization of a surface of revolution
 Solid of revolution
 Spheroid
 Surface integral
 Translation surface (differential geometry)

References

External links

Integral calculus
Surfaces of revolution